A bat is a flying mammal of the order Chiroptera.

Bat or The Bat may also refer to:

Sport
Bat, the stick-like implement used to hit the ball in bat-and-ball sports
Baseball bat
Cricket bat
Bat, an alternate name for a Racket
Table tennis racket or bat
Bolo bat

Computing
Bat (metasyntactic variable), a placeholder name
The Bat!, an email client by RitLabs for Microsoft Windows
.bat, file extension for a batch file

Film
The Bat (1926 film), a silent film
The Bat (1959 film)

Literature
The Bat (play), a 1920 play by Mary Roberts Rinehart and Avery Hopwood
The Bat (novel), a 1997 detective novel by Jo Nesbø
The Bat, a character in short stories by Johnston McCulley

Military
McDonnell XP-67 Bat, a U.S. Army Air Forces experimental fighter
Bat (guided bomb), developed by the U.S. during World War II
HMS Bat, a Royal Navy destroyer
USS Bat (1864), a steamer captured by the U.S. during the American Civil War
Northrop Grumman Bat, an unmanned aerial vehicle developed by Northrop Grumman
Bat bomb, an experimental World War II weapon developed by the United States
ASM-N-2 Bat, the first guided munition deployed in WWII by the United States

Roller coasters
Bat (Lagoon), a roller coaster at Lagoon Amusement Park, Utah, United States
The Bat (Canada's Wonderland), a roller coaster, Ontario, Canada
The Bat (Kings Island; opened 1981), a defunct roller coaster at Kings Island, Ohio, United States
The Bat (Kings Island; opened 1993), previously known as Top Gun and Flight Deck, a roller coaster at Kings Island, Ohio, United States

Other uses
Bat (goddess), in Egyptian mythology
Bat (heraldry)
Bat Motor Manufacturing Co., former manufacturer
One-hitter (smoking) or bat
Baltic languages's ISO 639-2 code
Bar and Bat Mitzvah, a coming of age ceremony in Judaism, with "bat" meaning daughter in Hebrew

See also
BAT (disambiguation)
Bats (disambiguation)
Batman (disambiguation)
Batt (disambiguation)
Batu (given name) or Bat, a Mongol-Turkic given name
La Chauve-Souris (The Bat), a Russian-French touring revue in the early 1900s
Die Fledermaus (The Bat), an 1874 comic operetta by Johann Strauss II